Herbert Lewis Mellersh (1869-1947), was a male badminton player from England.

Badminton career
Mellersh born in Surrey  was a three times winner of the All England Open Badminton Championships. He won the men's doubles in 1900, 1901 and 1902 with F. S. Collier He was a solicitor by trade.

References

English male badminton players
1869 births
1947 deaths